Satyrium behrii, the Behr's hairstreak, is a butterfly of the family Lycaenidae. It is found in western North America from western Texas north and west through New Mexico, Arizona, and southern California to British Columbia.

The wingspan is 24–32 mm. The upperside is orange with wide brown borders on the forewings. The underside of the males is brown, while females are brownish white. Both have postmarginal and submarginal lines of irregular small black spots. Adults are on wing from June to July in one generation per year. Its habitats include dry slopes and canyons. Adults feed on flower nectar.

The larvae feed on Purshia tridentata,Purshia glandulosa and Cercocarpus montanus.

Subspecies
S. b. behrii
S. b. columbia (McDunnough, 1944)
S. b. crossi (Field, 1938)

References

External links
Behr's hairstreak, Butterflies of Canada

Butterflies described in 1870
Satyrium (butterfly)
Butterflies of North America
Taxa named by William Henry Edwards